The Fujifilm X-S10 is a mid-range mirrorless interchangeable-lens camera announced on October 15, 2020. It has a backside-illuminated X-Trans CMOS 4 APS-C sensor, an X-Processor 4 quad core processor, In-Body Image Stabilization(IBIS) and uses the Fujifilm X-mount. The X-S10 is proposed as a hybrid camera aimed at still photographers, video shooters and vloggers, given its vlogger friendly features.

The camera is capable of recording video in 4K resolution in 30 fps. It can be had in either camera body only, with the 18-55mm  or 16-80  lens. The camera is styled after an SLR camera and comes only in black color.

The X-S10 is the first in a new line of cameras.

Key features 
 In-Body Image Stabilization, capable of up to 6.0 stops
 X-Trans IV CMOS sensor
 Quad Core X-Processor 4
 26.1 megapixels
 23.5 mm x 15.7 mm CMOS sensor (APS-C).
 Fully-articulate touchscreen
 14bit RAW image capture (6240 × 4160)
 Panorama capture, vertical (2160 × 9600) & horizontal (9600 × 1440)
 4K(3840x2160, 16:9) and DCI 4K(4096x2160, 17:9) video up to 30 fps, and FHD video recording up to 240 fps
 18 Film Simulation modes
 Wi-Fi and Bluetooth connectivity
 USB-C, HDMI-D, 3.5mm audio jack
 Large grip
 Pop-up flash
 Mode dial, front and rear command dials, and film simulation selection dial

Features 

The X-S10 looks similar to, and a smaller version of the X-H1. It also got the features from the X-T30. It is a mirrorless compact camera that is 200g lighter than the X-H1.

The camera is equipped with a five-axis in-body image stabilization system that is smaller and lighter than that of the X-T4.

The X-S10 is equipped with a joystick instead of a directional pad similar to Fujifilm's latest releases. Its LCD screen is fully articulated, similar to the X-T4 and X-T200.  It also has a vlogger-friendly features, such as the fully articulating display, in-body image stabilization, and a microphone input. It contains a 3.5mm audio jack, a micro HDMI port and a USB-C connection.

Fujifilm X-S10 will have a deep grip similar to X-H1. The camera can record in 4K in 30 fps.

Included accessories
 Li-ion battery NP-W126S
 USB cable
 Headphone Adapter
 Shoulder strap
 Body cap
 Owner's manual

References

External links

X-S10
Cameras introduced in 2020